Denis Šme (born 22 March 1994) is a retired Slovenian footballer who played as a defender.

Honours
Koper
Slovenian Cup: 2014–15
Slovenian Supercup: 2015

Maribor
Slovenian Championship: 2016–17
Slovenian Cup: 2015–16

Olimpija Ljubljana
Slovenian Cup: 2020–21

References

External links
NZS profile 

1994 births
Living people
Sportspeople from Slovenj Gradec
Slovenian footballers
Slovenia youth international footballers
Slovenia under-21 international footballers
Association football defenders
Slovenian expatriate footballers
Slovenian expatriate sportspeople in Italy
Expatriate footballers in Italy
Slovenian expatriate sportspeople in Austria
Expatriate footballers in Austria
FC Koper players
NK Maribor players
NK Aluminij players
NK Olimpija Ljubljana (2005) players
DSV Leoben players
Slovenian PrvaLiga players